Haitham Sabah Shaker Mohammed al-Badri (died 2 August 2007) was a commander of Al-Qaeda in Iraq (AQI) in Salahuddin Province who reportedly masterminded the 2006 al-Askari mosque bombing which substantially damaged the Shiite mosque and set off a wave of retaliatory violence by the Shiites against other Muslims. 

He was a former Iraqi government official under Saddam Hussein while other sources state he was a warrant officer in the Republican Guard; and following the US-led invasion in 2003, joined Jamaat Ansar al-Sunna before becoming a member of Al-Qaeda in Iraq. Badri was killed in a US airstrike east of Samarra on 2 August 2007.

He was a distant relative of future Islamic State leader Ibrahim al-Badri al-Samarrai (Abu Bakr al-Baghdadi), being the son of one of al-Baghdadi's cousins.

References

Year of birth missing
2007 deaths
Abu Bakr al-Baghdadi
Iraqi al-Qaeda members
Deaths by American airstrikes
Members of al-Qaeda in Iraq